Capitale de la douleur (Capital of Pain) is a book of poems by French surrealist poet Paul Éluard. The collection was first published in 1926.

Table of contents
 Répétitions
 Mourir de ne pas mourir
 Les petits justes
 Nouveaux poèmes.

Publication
Paris, Nouvelle revue française [1926]

Influence
In 1965, Jean-Luc Godard adapted several of the concepts in Éluard's poetry in his film Alphaville and quoted from it throughout. The main character can also be seen to be reading the book.

See also 
Le Monde 100 Books of the Century

1926 books
French poetry collections
20th-century French literature
Works published under a pseudonym
Poetry by Paul Éluard